Richmond Town Hall is a civic building located on Bridge Road in Richmond, a suburb of Melbourne, Australia.

Architecture
Built in the 1890s, the original Richmond Town Hall was in the Venetian Gothic Revival style, consisting of polychrome brickwork and a large tower. In the 1930s, the façade was remodelled in the Interwar Academic Classical Revival style, with Art Deco decorations, to become the Richmond City Hall.

The Town Hall was refurbished in 1991, but some sections of the rear of the building, and some interior spaces, retain the original Victorian era detailing. After the amalgamation of the City of Richmond with the City of Collingwood and the City of Fitzroy in 1994, to form the new City of Yarra, the Town Hall became the corporate headquarters for the new Yarra City Council.

See also
List of Town Halls in Melbourne
City of Yarra
List of mayors of Yarra
List of mayors of Richmond

References

External links

Town halls in Melbourne
Gothic Revival architecture in Melbourne
Neoclassical architecture in Australia
Art Deco architecture in Melbourne
1890s establishments in Australia
Buildings and structures in the City of Yarra
Clock towers in Australia